Tamdan Wade McCrory (born November 5, 1986) is an American professional mixed martial artist who formerly competed in the Middleweight division of the Ultimate Fighting Championship. A professional competitor since 2006, McCrory has also formerly competed for Bellator MMA and the Cage Fury Fighting Championships.

Background
McCrory was born and raised in the rural community of Ithaca, New York along with his twin sister. Growing up, McCrory was often bullied for being a self-proclaimed "nerd, " which later helped fuel his motivation for a career in mixed martial arts. McCrory attended and graduated from Ithaca High School in 2004 where he competed in wrestling and was a 2002 New York National Team Cadet for the Greco-Roman category. In May 2008, McCrory graduated from the State University of New York College at Cortland with a Bachelor of Science degree in Kinesiology.

Mixed martial arts career

Early career
McCrory began fighting mixed martial arts in 2006. He became one of the youngest NABC Champions at the age of 19. He also made an appearance in the BET show Iron Ring as a contestant in the Middleweight category. McCrory held an undefeated professional record of 8-0 before being signed by the UFC.

Ultimate Fighting Championship
In May 2007, McCrory signed a contract with the UFC.

McCrory made his debut defeating The Ultimate Fighter 4 alumni, Pete Spratt. Five months after the win, McCrory took his first professional defeat to Japanese superstar Akihiro Gono at UFC 78. He quickly bounced back with a win defeating The Ultimate Fighter 2 runner up, Luke Cummo. At UFC 91, McCrory lost his second fight to another up-and-coming Welterweight Dustin Hazelett. Tamdan was then a late call-up to fight Ryan Madigan at UFC 96. Tamdan lost to John Howard at UFC 101 on the preliminary card. Following the loss, McCrory was released from the UFC.

Post-UFC
McCrory stated his intentions to move into the Middleweight division. He was looking to gain a spot in the second season of Bellator's Middleweight Tournament, but his management's offer was declined. McCrory subsequently retired from MMA citing that it was taking too much time away from his family. Four years after his retirement, however, McCrory signed with Binns Management in 2013 and subsequently announced his return to mixed martial arts.

McCrory made his MMA return on September 5, 2014 when he faced Brennan Ward at Bellator 123. He won via spectacular knockout 21 seconds into the first round.

McCrory faced Jason Butcher at Bellator 134 on February 27, 2015. He won the fight via submission in the first round. In August 2015, McCrory was given his release from Bellator to re-sign with the UFC.

Return to UFC
Following two impressive wins in Bellator MMA, McCrory announced that he had re-signed with the UFC.

In his UFC return, McCrory faced Josh Samman on December 19, 2015 at UFC on Fox 17. He won the back-and-forth fight via submission in the third round.

McCrory next faced Krzysztof Jotko on June 18, 2016 at UFC Fight Night 89. He lost the fight via knockout in the first round.

McCrory faced Nate Marquardt on October 1, 2016 at UFC Fight Night 96. He lost the fight via knockout in the second round. Following this loss, he was released from the UFC.

Personal life
McCrory married his wife, Haley, in 2010. Haley is the morning news anchor for WBNG-TV in Binghamton, NY. The couple has a daughter, Keelin.

Championships and awards
North American Boxing Council
NABC MMA Welterweight Championship (One time)

Mixed martial arts record

|-
|Loss
|align=center|14–5 
|Nate Marquardt
| KO (punch and head kick)
|UFC Fight Night: Lineker vs. Dodson
|
|align=center| 2
|align=center| 4:44
|Portland, Oregon, United States
|  
|-
|Loss
|align=center|14–4
|Krzysztof Jotko
|KO (punches)
|UFC Fight Night: MacDonald vs. Thompson
|
|align=center|1
|align=center|0:59
|Ottawa, Ontario, Canada
|
|-
|Win
|align=center|14–3
|Josh Samman
|Submission (triangle choke)
|UFC on Fox: dos Anjos vs. Cowboy 2
|
|align=center|3
|align=center|4:10
|Orlando, Florida, United States
|
|-
|Win 
|align=center|13–3
|Jason Butcher
|Submission (armbar)
|Bellator 134
|
|align=center|1
|align=center|1:06
|Uncasville, Connecticut, United States
|
|-
|Win
|align=center|12–3
|Brennan Ward
|KO (punches)
|Bellator 123
|
|align=center|1
|align=center|0:21
|Uncasville, Connecticut, United States
|
|-
|Loss
|align=center|11–3
|John Howard
|Decision (split)
|UFC 101
|
|align=center|3
|align=center|5:00
|Philadelphia, Pennsylvania, United States
|
|-
|Win
|align=center|11–2
|Ryan Madigan
|TKO (punches)
|UFC 96
|
|align=center|1
|align=center|3:35
|Columbus, Ohio, United States
|
|-
|Loss
|align=center|10–2
|Dustin Hazelett
|Submission (reverse armbar)
|UFC 91
|
|align=center|1
|align=center|3:59
|Las Vegas, Nevada, United States
|
|-
|Win
|align=center|10–1
|Luke Cummo
|Decision (unanimous)
|UFC 87
|
|align=center|3
|align=center|5:00
|Minneapolis, Minnesota, United States
|
|-
|Loss
|align=center|9–1
|Akihiro Gono
|Submission (armbar)
|UFC 78
|
|align=center|2
|align=center|3:19
|Atlantic City, New Jersey, United States
|
|-
|Win
|align=center|9–0
|Pete Spratt
|Submission (triangle choke)
|UFC Fight Night: Stout vs. Fisher
|
|align=center|2
|align=center|2:04
|Hollywood, Florida, United States
|
|-
|Win
|align=center|8–0
|Nuri Shakir
|Submission (rear-naked choke)
|CFFC 4
|
|align=center|2
|align=center|3:22
|Atlantic City, New Jersey, United States
|
|-
|Win
|align=center|7–0
|Anthony D'Angelo
|TKO (punches)
|CFFC 3
|
|align=center|1
|align=center|2:34
|Atlantic City, New Jersey, United States
|
|-
|Win
|align=center|6–0
|Mike Littlefield
|TKO (punches)
|CFFC 2
|
|align=center|1
|align=center|4:10
|Atlantic City, New Jersey, United States
|
|-
|Win
|align=center|5–0
|Jason Giroux
|Technical Submission (triangle choke)
|WFL 10
|
|align=center|1
|align=center|3:07
|Revere, Massachusetts, United States
|
|-
|Win
|align=center|4–0
|Joe Manzello
|KO (punches)
|FFP: Untamed 7
|
|align=center|1
|align=center|4:45
|Revere, Massachusetts, United States
|
|-
|Win
|align=center|3–0
|Brendan Hoxie
|TKO (body kick)
|CZ 17
|
|align=center|2
|align=center|1:37
|Plymouth, Massachusetts, United States
|
|-
|Win
|align=center|2–0
|Bobby Diaz
|TKO (punches)
|FFP: Untamed 5
|
|align=center|2
|align=center|0:42
|Mansfield, Massachusetts, United States
|
|-
|Win
|align=center|1–0
|John Jenner
|TKO (punches)
|WFL: Judgment Night 2
|
|align=center|1
|align=center|1:19
|Revere, Massachusetts, United States
|
|-

References

External links
Professional MMA record from Sherdog.com
Official Facebook Page of The Barncat

- Broome County Martial Arts Academy

1986 births
Living people
American male mixed martial artists
Mixed martial artists from New York (state)
Welterweight mixed martial artists
Middleweight mixed martial artists
Mixed martial artists utilizing Greco-Roman wrestling
Mixed martial artists utilizing Brazilian jiu-jitsu
American practitioners of Brazilian jiu-jitsu
People awarded a black belt in Brazilian jiu-jitsu
American male sport wrestlers
Sportspeople from Binghamton, New York
Ultimate Fighting Championship male fighters
Ithaca High School (Ithaca, New York) alumni